Charles Edward McIntosh (April 13, 1836July 25, 1915) was a Canadian American immigrant, lawyer, Democratic politician, and Wisconsin pioneer.  He was a member of the Wisconsin State Assembly, representing Outagamie County in the 1869, 1870, and 1871 sessions.  His name is often abbreviated as C. E. McIntosh.

Early life
Charles E. McIntosh was born in Huron County, Ontario, in April 1836.  As a child, he emigrated to the Wisconsin Territory with his family.  They first settled at Milwaukee, then moved to New Berlin, in Waukesha County.  In 1844, they moved to Ashippun, in Dodge County, where he received most of his education.  He moved to Oshkosh, Wisconsin, in 1855 and worked there until going to Indiana to study at the University of Notre Dame in 1856.  He returned to Dodge County, Wisconsin, in 1859 and taught school.  He was elected superintendent of schools for Dodge County in 1861, but resigned to enter the Union Army after the outbreak of the American Civil War.

Civil War service

He quickly volunteered for service in the Union Army and was enrolled as a private in the 7th Independent Battery Wisconsin Light Artillery.  The 7th Battery was recruited in Milwaukee and mustered into service in Racine, Wisconsin, in October 1861.  They were active in the western theater of the war.  McIntosh rose to the rank of corporal, and during 1864, he was detailed as staff for the court martial at Memphis, Tennessee, until the end of his three-year enlistment.

He subsequently re-enlisted and served as a sergeant in the 2nd U.S. Infantry Regiment in the Army of the Shenandoah near the end of the war, and was camped at Winchester, Virginia, at the time of Lee's surrender.  He returned with his regiment to Washington, D.C., and was present at the execution of Mary Surratt and other conspirators in the assassination of Abraham Lincoln.  He was then assigned to Elmira, New York, as ordnance sergeant and mustered out of service on February 3, 1866.

Political career

On his return to Wisconsin, he moved north to Appleton, Wisconsin.  He became affiliated with the Democratic Party of Wisconsin, and was the Democratic nominee for Wisconsin State Assembly in Outagamie County in 1868.  He won that election and was re-elected in 1869 and 1870.

During the 1871 session, redistricting was carried out and Outagamie County was divided between two districts under the new map.  McIntosh ran for a fourth term in the new district, which comprised roughly the southern half of Outagamie County, but was defeated in the general election by Republican William H. H. Wroe.

Around the time of the Fall 1871 election, McIntosh attacked county judge Samuel Ryan, Jr., who was participating in the vote count.  It is not known what led to the sudden attack on Ryan, who was also a Democrat.  A crowd quickly separated the two men and McIntosh was arrested.

Legal career

After leaving office, McIntosh pursued a legal career and was admitted to the bar in 1874.  He partnered for several years with William Kennedy, who was later district attorney.  He moved further north in Outagamie County in the latter part of the decade and became one of the first city officers of Seymour, Wisconsin, after it was incorporated in 1879.  He remained there until 1881, when he moved north to Florence County, Wisconsin, which was just in the process of being organized as a new county.  He was elected the first district attorney of the county, and was then elected to a full two-year term in that office at the first general election in the Fall of 1882.

While serving as district attorney, McIntosh was involved in another public disturbance when, in June 1884, he and the county sheriff James E. Readmon, exchanged pistol fire in the streets.  The sheriff was grievously wounded, while McIntosh escaped unharmed and was arrested.  McIntosh was said to have fired the first shot, angry with the sheriff over accusations that he had accepted bribes and consorted with criminals.  The sheriff lingered near death for several days, but ultimately survived.  The duel became a scandal around the state, with papers from Appleton to Milwaukee denouncing both men.  McIntosh soon resigned his office, facing prosecution.  The case against him, however, was eventually abandoned.

McIntosh subsequently moved to Marinette, Wisconsin, where he continued to work as a lawyer in partnership with J. A. Parkhurst.  McIntosh ran for district attorney again in Marinette County. He was defeated in 1888, but ran again in 1890 and won a two-year term.

He continued to practice law in Marinette County through the 1890s and, in 1904, he returned to Appleton.  His later years were spent at the Wisconsin Veterans Home in King, Waupaca County, Wisconsin.  He died there in 1915 and was buried at the Central Wisconsin Veterans Memorial Cemetery.

Personal life and family

Charles McIntosh married Mary E. Conklin in 1864.  They went on to have six children.

McIntosh petitioned for divorce from Conklin in 1888 in order to marry the widow Mrs. Maria D. Sweet ( Durgan).  Conklin was awarded custody of the children and fifty dollars per month from him.

In addition to his infamy for his feuds with other elected officials, McIntosh received public scorn for horse-whipping his married adult step-daughter, Mrs. Irma Gault, in 1894.  McIntosh and his second wife divorced later that year.

Electoral history

Wisconsin Assembly (1869, 1870, 1871)

| colspan="6" style="text-align:center;background-color: #e9e9e9;"| General Election, November 2, 1869 
 

| colspan="6" style="text-align:center;background-color: #e9e9e9;"| General Election, November 8, 1870 
 

| colspan="6" style="text-align:center;background-color: #e9e9e9;"| General Election, November 7, 1871

References

|-

|-
 

|-

1836 births
1915 deaths
Pre-Confederation Canadian emigrants to the United States
People from Huron County, Ontario
Politicians from Milwaukee
People from New Berlin, Wisconsin
Politicians from Appleton, Wisconsin
People from Seymour, Wisconsin
People from Florence, Wisconsin
People from Marinette, Wisconsin
University of Notre Dame alumni
Democratic Party members of the Wisconsin State Assembly
District attorneys in Wisconsin
People of Wisconsin in the American Civil War
Union Army soldiers
19th-century American politicians
Wisconsin pioneers
American duellists